Instituto Miguel Ángel de Occidente A.C. (IMAO) is a private school in Zapopan, Jalisco, Mexico, in the Guadalajara metropolitan area. It serves preschool through senior high school (preparatoria).

It was founded in 2001 by the Congregación de las Hermanas de la Caridad del Verbo Encarnado.

It is affiliated with the Instituto Miguel Ángel in Mexico City.

References

External links
 Instituto Miguel Ángel de Occidente A.C. 

High schools in Mexico
Buildings and structures in Jalisco
Education in Jalisco
2001 establishments in Mexico
Educational institutions established in 2001